The Downie River is an approximately  tributary of the North Yuba River in Sierra County, California, in the United States. The river originates from the confluence of the West Branch Downie River and Rattlesnake Creek in the Tahoe National Forest, and flows south to its confluence with the North Yuba at Downieville. Tributaries include Lavezzola Creek and Pauley Creek, which both join the Downie from the left shortly above the mouth.

The river and town are named after Scottish prospector William Downie, who settled here in 1850.

External links

California Rivers: Downie River – Friends of the River
Downieville – California Gold Country

Rivers of Sierra County, California
Yuba River
Rivers of the Sierra Nevada (United States)
Rivers of Northern California
Rivers of the Sierra Nevada in California